The eastern casquehead iguana (Laemanctus longipes) is a species of  lizard in the family Corytophanidae. The species is native to Mexico and Central America.

Geographic range
L. longipes is found in the southern Mexican states of Colima, Oaxaca, Veracruz, and Yucatán, and in the Central American countries of Belize, Guatemala, Honduras, and Nicaragua.

Description
Long and thin, L. longipes can reach 70 cm (27.5 in) in total length, two-thirds of which is a thin tail.

The scales on the forehead are much larger than those on the back of the head. No projecting triangular scales occur on the posterior border of the head.  The gular scales are bicarinate or tricarinate.

Sexual dimorphism is present, but is difficult to observe. Males have a somewhat thicker tail root than females, and the hemipenes are sometimes visible when lifting the tail gently.

Habitat
The eastern casquehead iguana inhabits tropical wet, moist, and seasonally dry forests. It can persist in secondary growth when suitable trees are present.

Behavior
The eastern casquehead iguana is an arboreal species occurring high up in the trees. Rather slow, it sits on trees and bushes above water courses, licking water drops on leaves, and catching insects that walk nearby. L. longipes lives individually, or in a territory with one male and one to three females. Usually, however, males and females only meet for mating, which can happen several times per year.

Reproduction
L. longipes is oviparous.

Subspecies
Two subspecies are recognized, including the nominotypical subspecies.

L. l. deborrei 
L. l. longipes

Etymology
The subspecific name, deborrei, is in honor of Belgian entomologist Alfred Preudhomme de Borre (1833–1905).

Captivity

The eastern casquehead iguana is sometimes bred in captivity, but it is not a good terrarium companion for beginners, as it quickly and often dehydrates. Daily misting or a water-dropping system is essential. Temperatures should range between 25 and 35 °C (77 and 95 °F) during the day, and between 20 and 23 °C (68 and 73.4 °F) during the night. Humidity should range between 70 and 90%. L. longipes is a cricket eater and should receive at least four or five adult crickets every day. It also needs UVA and UVB lighting and an additional vitamin and calcium feed once a week.

References

Further reading
Boulenger GA (1877). "Étude monographique du genre Læmanctus et description d'une espèce nouvelle ". Bulletin de la Société Zoologique de France 2: 460-466 + Plate VII. ("Læmanctus de Borrei ", new species, pp. 465–466 + Plate VII, figures 1, 1a, 1b). (in French).
McCoy CJ (1968). "A review of the genus Laemanctus (Reptilia, Iguanidae)". Copeia 1968 (4): 665–678.
Wiegmann AFA (1834). Herpetologia Mexicana, seu Descriptio Amphibiorum Novae Hispaniae, quae Itineribus Comitis de Sack, Ferdinandi Deppe et Chr. Guil. Schiede in Museum Berolinense Pervenerunt. Pars Prima, Saurorum Species Amplectens. Adiecto Systematis Saurorum Prodromo, Additisque Multis in hunc Amphibiorum Ordinem Observationibus. Berlin: C.G. Lüderitz. vi + 54 pp. + Plates I-X. (Laemanctus longipes, new species, pp. 46–47 + Plate IV). (in Latin).

Laemanctus
Lizards of Central America
Lizards of North America
Reptiles of Mexico
Reptiles of Guatemala
Reptiles of Belize
Reptiles of Honduras
Reptiles of Nicaragua
Reptiles described in 1834
Taxa named by Arend Friedrich August Wiegmann